The discography of the South Korean singer Baekhyun consists of four extended plays, seven singles, two promotional singles, and two soundtrack appearances. Baekhyun started his musical career as part of the South Korean boy band Exo in April 2012.

In January 2016, Baekhyun and Suzy released a duet titled "Dream". The song quickly reached the top on online real-time music charts and later debuted at number one on Gaon's weekly digital chart. In May 2016, Baekhyun and South Korean singer K.Will released a folk-ballad duet titled "The Day" as part of SM Entertainment's music project Station. In February 2017, Baekhyun and Soyou released the collaborative single "Rain". The song reached number one on every South Korean online music chart, an achievement known as "all-kill", making him the first SM Entertainment artist to achieve "all-kill" in both 2016 and 2017 with "Dream" and "Rain" respectively. In April 2017, Baekhyun released a single titled "Take You Home" for the second season of the Station project. In August 2018, Baekhyun and rapper Loco released a collaboration track titled "Young" for the Station project.

Baekhyun released his first extended play, titled City Lights on July 10, 2019. The EP sold more than 400,000 copies after eight days of pre-orders, and eventually sold over 570,000 copies, which made it the best-selling album by a soloist in the 2010s in South Korea.

On March 25, 2020, Baekhyun released his second extended play, Delight. It was reported that the pre-order sales of Delight had surpassed more than 730,000 copies, making it the most pre-ordered album by a soloist in South Korean history. The album sold over 1,000,000 copies, making it the first album by a soloist in South Korea to do so since Another Days (2001) by Kim Gun-mo.

Baekhyun released his third extended play, Bambi, on March 30, 2021. It was reported that the pre-order sales of Bambi had surpassed 833,000 copies, surpassing his own record making it the most pre-ordered album by a soloist in South Korean history. On April 19, it was announced that the album had surpassed 1 million sales, making it Baekhyun’s second album to reach this milestone after Delight.

Extended plays

Single albums

Singles

As lead artist

As featured artist

Promotional singles

Other charted songs

Soundtrack appearances

Other appearances

Songwriting credits

Music videos

As lead artist

Videos of soundtracks

Appearances in music videos

Other appearances

Notes

References

External links
  

Discography
Discographies of South Korean artists
K-pop discographies